Deqa Dhalac (born  1968 or 1969 in Mogadishu, Somalia) is a member of the Maine House of Representatives for the 120th District. A Somali emigrant, she served as the mayor of South Portland, Maine from 2021 to 2022, becoming the first African-born female mayor in the United States. Alongside Mana Abdi, she is the first Somali-American to serve as a Maine legislator.

Early life 
Dhalac was born in the capital city of Mogadishu, the middle child with two brothers. Her father, a petroleum engineer, was very politically outspoken. Dhalac described her father as a feminist because he believed in the importance of girls' education and their important role in the family unit. He died in 1989. She learned English as a child as part of her education.

Time period as a refugee 
Due to the precipitating events leading to the Somali Civil War, Dhalac fled in 1990, to Rome on a flight intended to head to Libya. Because there were no more embassy services available on the precipice of war, she planned to apply for asylum. Unfortunately 17 other people had the same idea, so they were held at the airport for over a month. She was released to the care of her cousin who lived in Italy. Dhalac then moved to England, and to Toronto in 1991.

Life in America 
In 1992, she married Abdi Farah, a Somali businessman from Atlanta, whose family had been close with her own, and began activism to get immigrants to become citizens and register to vote. She worked as a cashier in a parking garage. With her accounting degree, she received an accounts receivable job in a hotel a few months later. Because she had known English as a second language, it was easier for her to excel in her career in the United States.

In 2005, she moved to Lewiston, Maine, with her family but without her husband, who stayed to take care of his business in Atlanta but visits them frequently.

Dhalac became an interpreter for Catholic Charities Maine before opening her own interpreting service, and earned two masters' degrees in policy and social work from the University of New Hampshire and the University of New England.

Political career 
Dhalac made national headlines as the first Somali-American mayor in the United States when she was elected unanimously for the post in the city of South Portland, Maine.

In 2022, after State Representative Victoria Morales withdrew from the race for Maine's 120th State House District, Dhalac was nominated to take her place on the ballot. She won election to the Maine House of Representatives on November 8, 2022.

References 

Living people
African-American mayors in Maine
Politicians from South Portland, Maine
People from Mogadishu
Somalian expatriates in Italy
Somalian Sunni Muslims
People from Lewiston, Maine
University of New Hampshire alumni
University of New England (United States) alumni
American accountants
American Muslims
Somalian refugees
American politicians of Somalian descent
1968 births
African-American women mayors